William Henry Cail (28 February 1849 in Gateshead – 25 November 1925 in Newcastle upon Tyne) was an English rugby pioneer.

William Cail introduced rugby in Cannstatt in 1865. That was the beginning of a community of players which founded later the predecessor clubs of VfB Stuttgart.

William Cail established the Northern Football Club. In 1892 he was elected president of the Rugby Football Union. In 1894 William Cail became treasurer of the RFU. His influence was important when the Rugby Football Union purchased the Twickenham ground. William Cail was head coach of the British and Irish Lions during the 1910 British Lions tour to South Africa.

References

External links
 Profile at cricketarchive.com

1849 births
1925 deaths
English rugby union players
English rugby union coaches
Rugby union officials
Rugby union players from Gateshead